2 Years On is the eighth studio album by the Bee Gees, which reached No. 32 on the US charts. Released in 1970, the album saw the return of Robin Gibb to the group after an earlier disagreement and subsequent split following Odessa. 2 Years On was the first album with drummer Geoff Bridgford, who remained a full-time member of the group until 1972 although he was not pictured on the sleeve. The best-known track is "Lonely Days". Released as the first single by the reunited brothers, it charted high in the US (No. 3 on the Billboard Hot 100 and No. 1 on the rival chart Cashbox), but peaked at No. 33 in the United Kingdom.

Background
In March 1969, Robin announced that he was leaving the band. In June, he released his debut solo single "Saved by the Bell", which reached No. 2 on the UK charts. In August, drummer Colin Petersen was fired and was replaced by Terry Cox to complete the album Cucumber Castle. Before the album was released, Barry and Maurice announced that the Bee Gees had split in December 1969. The pair released singles, "Railroad" by Maurice and "I'll Kiss Your Memory" by Barry, but their respective albums The Loner and The Kid's No Good remain unreleased to this day. During the temporary break-up of the group, Maurice appeared in London musical theatre production Sing a Rude Song. Maurice recalls: "We got fed up with all the lawyers fighting over our assets, so we walked out of this big summit meeting and started the group again".

Recording
Robin and Maurice reunited in June 1970 with new drummer Geoff Bridgford. They recorded four songs, including "Sincere Relation" and "Lay It on Me". "We Can Lift a Mountain" was also re-recorded, a song from 1968. After that, Maurice joined the supergroup The Bloomfields with Billy Lawrie, and worked with Tin Tin. In August, Maurice and Robin announced that the Bee Gees were back with or without Barry's participation, and fourteen songs were recorded including "Back Home" and "I'm Weeping". On 21 August, the three Bee Gees came together to continue recording as Barry announced, "The Bee Gees are there and they will never, ever part again". He continues, "If a solo record comes out, it will be with enthusiasm and great support of each of us. We are a musical establishment". Maurice, on the other hand, recalled: "We just discussed it and re-formed".

Release
Around the same time, Barry's "One Bad Thing" / "The Day Your Eyes Meet Mine" was withdrawn at the last minute in the US for single release, while Polydor planned to release "One Bad Thing" as a single by 2 October (probably in Europe and Asia). Despite Barry's longing to prove himself as a solo artist, it was decided instead that the next single should be performed by the Bee Gees as they reunited around the same time.

Despite the album marking the musical reunion of the Bee Gees, only three songs credited all three Gibb brothers as composers: the single "Lonely Days", its flip side "Man For All Seasons", and "Back Home". Maurice sings on all songs, but Barry and Robin are only on the ones they wrote or co-wrote. In the August sessions, they also recorded "You Got to Lose It in the End", "Little Red Train", "Sweet Summer Rain", "Melody Fair" (originally released on Odessa) and "Maybe Tomorrow". None of these were released.

Track listing

Alternate track listing

Personnel
Credits from Joseph Brennan.

Bee Gees
Barry Gibb – lead, harmony and backing vocals; rhythm guitar
Robin Gibb – lead, harmony and backing vocals; organ on “I’m Weeping”
Maurice Gibb – harmony and backing vocals, bass guitar, lead and rhythm guitars, piano, lead vocals on “Lay It On Me”
Additional musicians and production staff
Geoff Bridgford – drums
 Bill Shepherd, Gerry Shury – orchestral arrangement
 John Stewart – engineer

Charts

References

Bee Gees albums
1970 albums
Polydor Records albums
Atco Records albums
Albums produced by Robert Stigwood
Albums produced by Robin Gibb
Albums produced by Barry Gibb
Albums produced by Maurice Gibb
Albums recorded at IBC Studios
Soft rock albums by English artists
Symphonic rock albums